Frontier Gun is a 1958 American Western film directed by Paul Landres and written by Stephen Kandel. The film stars John Agar, Joyce Meadows, Barton MacLane, Robert Strauss, Lyn Thomas and James Griffith. The film was released on December 1, 1958, by 20th Century Fox.

Plot

Cast 
John Agar as Sheriff Jim Crayle
Joyce Meadows as Peg Barton
Barton MacLane as Simon Crayle
Robert Strauss as Yubo
Lyn Thomas as Kate Durand
James Griffith as Cash Skelton
Morris Ankrum as Andrew Barton
Leslie Bradley as Rev. Jacob Hall
Doodles Weaver as Eph Loveman
Mike Ragan as Tanner 
Tom Daly as Cowhand
Sammy Ogg as Virgil Barton
George Brand as Judge Ard Becker
Claire Du Brey as Bess Loveman
Dan White as Sam Kilgore
Dan Simmons as Harry Corman
Sydney Mason as Doc Studdeford

References

External links 
 

1958 films
20th Century Fox films
American Western (genre) films
1958 Western (genre) films
Films directed by Paul Landres
Films scored by Paul Dunlap
1950s English-language films
1950s American films